William C. Smith may refer to:
 William Charles Smith (1881–1971), English musicologist
 William Craig Smith (1918–1986), American art director
 William Crawford Smith (1837–1899), American architect and Confederate veteran
 Sir William Cusack-Smith, 2nd Baronet (1766–1836), Irish baronet, politician, and judge
 William Cunningham Smith (1871–1943), American academic, university administrator, and writer
 William C. Smith (politician) (1875–1968), Alberta MLA
 William C. Smith Jr. (born 1982), American politician in the Maryland State Senate

See also
 William Smith (disambiguation)